Wooler Water is a stream that flows through Wooler in Northumberland, England. Its main tributary is the Harthope Burn.

References

Rivers of Northumberland
2Wooler